Car of the Year (COTY) is a common abbreviation for numerous automotive awards.

The "Car of the Year" phrase is considered to have been introduced by Motor Trend magazine in 1949 when the new publication named Cadillac as Motor Trend Car of the Year.

Other publications and various organizations also have developed COTY recognitions. 
The Australian automobile magazine Wheels began an award in 1963.

In 1964, a jury of European automotive journalists began selecting the European Car of the Year award.

Many COTY awards focus on regional markets, vehicle types, or market segments. An example is the "tow car of the year" in the UK (for pulling travel trailers). or the COTY AJAC award in Canada.

Criteria
The COTY is meant to award excellence in automotive design. 
Criteria vary, but the World Car of the Year are typical:
eligible cars are all those that have been launched and gone on sale in the past year
must be available on at least two continents
juror can borrow the car in question from manufacturer fleet of test cars
fitness for purpose
real-world practicalities such as running costs, interior space and comfort, acceleration, handling, roadholding, ride comfort, noise levels, fit, finish, visual and tactile quality of the interior 
Innovation - advance of car design and engineering

The originator of the COTY award, Motor Trend, uses these criteria:
 Advancement in design
 Engineering excellence - integrity of the total vehicle concept and execution and use of technologies that benefit the consumer
 Efficiency - fuel economy and overall operating costs
 Safety - protect occupants from harm in a crash and avoid a crash 
 Value - relative to competitors in the same market segment
 Performance of intended function

Global
 World Car of the Year selected by a jury of 82 international automotive journalists from 24 countries, beginning in 2003

Regional
 European Car of the Year selected by a collective of automobile magazines from different countries in Europe. The current organisers of the award are Auto (Italy), Autocar (United Kingdom), Autopista (Spain), Autovisie (Netherlands), L'Automobile Magazine (France), Stern (Germany) and Vi Bilägare (Sweden). The voting jury consists of motoring journalists from publications throughout Europe.
 Middle East Car of the Year (MECOTY) https://www.mecoty.com/
 North American Car of the Year - 60 automotive journalists from the US and Canada

National
 Drive Car of the Year (Australia)
 Wheels magazine's Car of the Year (Australia)
 Canadian Car of the Year
 China Car of the Year
 German Car of the Year
 Das Goldene Lenkrad (Germany)
 Indian Car of the Year
 Irish Car of the Year
 Japan Car of the Year
 RJC Car of the Year (Japan)
 Korean Car of the Year
 Lithuanian Car of the Year
 Qatar Car of the Year - Maqina Magazine (QCOTY) (Qatar) 
 Russian Car of the Year
South African Car of the Year
 UK Car of the Year
 Auto Express magazine's Car of the Year Awards (UK)
 Evo Magazine's Evo Car of the year [eCoty] (UK)
 Fifth Gear's Car of the Year Awards (UK)
 Top Gear's Car of the Year Awards (UK)
 What Car? magazine's Car of the Year (UK)
 Automobile Magazine's Automobile of the Year (USA)
 Car and Driver magazine's Ten Best (USA)
 Motor Trend magazine's Motor Trend Car of the Year The magazine continues its COTY award begun in 1949, and has also expanded to separate trophies for pickup trucks and sport utility vehicles (SUVs)  (USA)
 MotorWeek magazine's Driver's Choice Awards (USA)
 Green Car of the Year selected by Green Car Journal (USA)
 Carsguide Car of the Year
 International Car of the Year selected by Road & Travel Magazine''  (USA)

Sample Results

See also
List of motor vehicle awards

References

Motor vehicle awards
1940s neologisms
 

pl:Samochód Roku
sco:Caur o the Year